Gurbanov is a masculine surname of Azerbaijani origin. The feminine surname counterpart would be Gurbanova. People with this name include:
Gurban Gurbanov (born 1972), former Azerbaijani footballer and manager of Qarabağ FK
Ilgar Gurbanov (born 1986), Azerbaijani footballer for Gabala FK
Ruslan Gurbanov (born 1991), Azerbaijani footballer for Sabail FK
Sanan Gurbanov (born 1980), former Azerbaijani footballer and manager of Gabala FK
Chingiz Gurbanov (1994–2016), soldier and National Hero of Azerbaijan
Shikhali Gurbanov (1925–1967), Azerbaijani writer and statesman
Gudrat Gurbanov, Azerbaijani politician
Agadadash Gurbanov (1911–1965), Azerbaijani actor
Makhmud Gurbanov (born 1973), Azerbaijani footballer for Sumgayit FK

Surnames of Asian origin